Benson Hunt is a Samoan international footballer who plays as a forward for Vailima Kiwi. He made his debut for the Samoa national team on 31 August 2015 in a 3–2 victory against American Samoa during 2018 World Cup qualification.

Hunt was the top scorer and most valuable player of the 2013–14 Samoa National League while playing with Vaitoloa. He was in the Vailima Kiwi squad that took part in the 2016 OFC Champions League and was an unused substitute twice in the preliminary stage.

References

Living people
1990 births
Samoan footballers
Association football forwards
Kiwi FC players
Samoa international footballers